Jacqueline Martel (11 January 1927 – 11 January 2015) was a French alpine skier. She competed in two events at the 1952 Winter Olympics.

References

External links
 

1927 births
2015 deaths
French female alpine skiers
Olympic alpine skiers of France
Alpine skiers at the 1952 Winter Olympics
Sportspeople from Haute-Savoie